Eager Street Academy (previously Baltimore City Detention Center, School No. 370) is a public, alternative middle-high school serving youth who are incarcerated, located in the Penn-Fallsway neighborhood of Baltimore, Maryland, United States. The school was launched in 1998 as a collaboration between Baltimore City Public Schools (BCPSS), Maryland State Department of Education and the state's Division of Pretrial Detention and Services, and is a part of the larger city school system.  Initially without an official name beyond its numeric designation, the school was given the name "Eager Street Academy" in 2002.

Based inside the Baltimore City Detention Center, an adult detention facility, Eager Street serves students under 18 who have been charged as adults.  BCPSS officials have claimed the school is the only public school in the United States located inside of a jail.  Classes at the school were initially held in six portable trailers on the grounds of the BCDC, but its classrooms are now located within a purpose-built juvenile detention facility built in 2017.

References

External links
 Eager Street Academy at Baltimore City Schools

Public schools in Baltimore
Public high schools in Maryland
Alternative schools in the United States
East Baltimore